The Human Development Index (HDI) is a summary measure of average achievement in key dimensions of human development: a long and healthy life, knowledge, and a decent standard of living. It is a standard means of measuring well-being. It is used to distinguish whether the country is a developed, developing, or underdeveloped country, and also to measure the impact of economic policies on quality of life. Countries fall into four broad categories based on their HDI: very high, high, medium, and low human development. Currently, all European countries fall into the very high or high human development category.

List 
The table below presents the latest Human Development Index (HDI) for countries in Europe as included in a United Nations Development Programme's Human Development Report (released in 2020). Previous HDI values and rankings are retroactively recalculated using the same updated data sets and current methodologies, as presented in Table 2 of the Statistical Annex of the Human Development Report.

Countries that are not entirely located in Europe are shown here in italics, but HDI figures are given for the whole country. Monaco, San Marino, and Vatican City are not ranked as they are not included in the latest report by the United Nations Development Programme. Kosovo is also not included.

Map 
This is the map of the list of European countries by the Human Development Index for the year 2021. The colour indicators are as follows:  High Human Development and  Very High Human Development.

See also 
International organisations in Europe
List of countries by GDP (nominal)
List of countries by GDP (nominal) per capita
List of countries by GDP (PPP)
List of countries by GDP (PPP) per capita
List of countries by Human Development Index
List of countries by Human Development Index by region
List of countries by percentage of population living in poverty
List of European countries by budget revenues
List of European countries by budget revenues per capita
List of European countries by GDP (nominal) per capita
List of European countries by GNI (nominal) per capita
List of European countries by GNI (PPP) per capita

Notes

References

Human Development
Europe
Economy of Europe-related lists